Cyrtodactylus bokorensis is a species of gecko endemic to Cambodia.

References

Cyrtodactylus
Reptiles described in 2019
Reptiles of Cambodia
Endemic fauna of Cambodia